Helen Louise B. Babcock (August 13, 1867-4 November 1929) was an American educator, elocutionist, and dramatic reader.

Early years and education
Helen Louise Bailey was born in Galva, Illinois. August 13, 1867. She early displayed a marked talent for elocution and on reaching woman's estate she decided to make dramatic reading her profession. With that aim she became a pupil in the Cumnock School of Oratory of the Northwestern University, and, being an earnest student, she was graduated with the highest honors.

Career
Afterwards, she became an assistant instructor in the same oratorical school, and was very successful in the work of developing elocutionary and dramatic talents in others. Perfectly familiar with the work, she was able to guide students rapidly over the rough places. After severing her connection with the Cumnock school, she taught for a time in Mount Vernon Seminary and College, Washington, D.C. After the death of her mother, in 1890, she accompanied her father abroad and spent some time in visiting the principal countries of Europe. In 1891, she married Dr. F. C. Babcock, a successful physician of Hastings, Nebraska, where she lived afterwards.

In 1917, she graduated from the Posse Gymnasium.

References

Attribution

External links
 

1867 births
People from Galva, Illinois
Educators from Illinois
19th-century American women educators
19th-century American educators
Northwestern University alumni
Northwestern University faculty
1929 deaths
American women academics